Neomedetera is a genus of flies belonging to the family Dolichopodidae. It contains only a single species, Neomedetera membranacea, described from China.

References

Medeterinae
Dolichopodidae genera
Monotypic Diptera genera
Diptera of Asia
Endemic fauna of China